Juan Fernández la Villa (born 4 June 1985) is a former Spanish field hockey player who played for the Spain national team. He played club hockey for Club de Campo in Madrid and was a member of the Spanish National Team that claimed the silver medal at the 2008 Summer Olympics in Beijing, PR China.

He also competed for the national team in the men's tournament at the 2012 Summer Olympics.

He studied for a degree in Medicine at the Complutense University of Madrid.

References

External links
 
 
 

1985 births
Living people
Spanish male field hockey players
Olympic field hockey players of Spain
2006 Men's Hockey World Cup players
Field hockey players at the 2008 Summer Olympics
Olympic silver medalists for Spain
Sportspeople from Oviedo
Field hockey players at the 2012 Summer Olympics
Medalists at the 2008 Summer Olympics
Real Grupo de Cultura Covadonga sportsmen
Club de Campo Villa de Madrid players